Goldsack is a surname. Notable people with the surname include:

Drew Goldsack (born 1981), Canadian cross country skier
Elsie Goldsack Pittman (1904–1975), English tennis player
George MacDonald Goldsack (1902–1969), British businessman
Jennifer Goldsack (born 1982), American rower
Tyson Goldsack (born 1987), Australian rules football player
William Goldsack (1871–1957), Australian Baptist missionary